:There was also a Two Ronnies mini-series of this name.

Stop, You're Killing Me is a 1952 black comedy film directed by Roy Del Ruth and starring Broderick Crawford and Claire Trevor.

Premise
The surprise appearance of four corpses interferes with a beer baron's plans to crash high society.

Synopsis 
When the Eighteenth Amendment of the Constitution is repealed, a former prohibition baron, Remy Marko (Broderick Crawford), decides to get honest and ventures into the legal production and marketing of beer. The poor quality of his production leads him to bankruptcy, and he finds himself in conflict with these creditors. To make matters worse, his daughter, Marko Mary (Virginia Gibson), intends to marry policeman Chance Whitelaw (Bill Hayes), heir to a wealthy family. To look good, Remy Marko and his wife Nora (Claire Trevor) organize a reception in a rich hotel in Saratoga. But the party is disrupted by the death of four gangsters, murdered by Innocent (Harry Morgan), a mobster working for the creditors who are in pursuit of Remy. The latter must juggle between his family, his daughter's future marriage, his bankrupt business and the police investigation in order to save his new image.

Cast
Broderick Crawford as Remy Marko
Claire Trevor as Nora Marko
Virginia Gibson as Mary Marko
Bill Hayes as Chancellor 'Chance' Whitelaw
Margaret Dumont as Mrs. Harriet Whitelaw

Production notes
Production Dates: mid-June to late August 1952.

Based on the 1935 play by Damon Runyon and Howard Lindsay.  Warner Bros. previously had adapted Runyon and Lindsay's play into a 1938 film under the play's title, starring Edward G. Robinson and directed by Lloyd Bacon.

References

External links

1952 films
1950s crime comedy films
1950s English-language films
American crime comedy films
Films directed by Roy Del Ruth
Films scored by David Buttolph
Films scored by Ray Heindorf
Remakes of American films
American films based on plays
1952 comedy films
1950s American films